South Korea participated in the 2006 Asian Games in Doha, Qatar on 1–15 December 2006. South Korea ranked 2nd with 58 gold medals in this edition of the Asiad.

Medal summary

Medal table

Medalists

Gold
 Archery – Men's individual : Im Dong-Hyun 
 Archery – Women's individual : Park Sung-hyun 
 Archery – Men's team : Im Dong-Hyun, Jang Yong-Ho, Lee Chang-Hwan, Park Kyung-Mo
 Archery – Women's team : Lee Tuk-Young, Park Sung-hyun, Yun Mi-Jin, Yun Ok-Hee
 Athletics – Men's javelin throw : Park Jae-Myong 
 Bowling – Men's masters : Jo Nam-Yi
 Bowling – Women's trios : Kim Hyo-Mi, Hwang Sun-Ok, Nam Bo-Ra
 Bowling – Women's all events : Choi Jin-A
 Bowling – Women's masters : Choi Jin-A
 Cycling – Men's keirin : Kang Dong-Jin 
 Cycling – Men's individual pursuit : Jang Sun-jae 
 Cycling – Women's individual pursuit : Lee Min-Hye 
 Cycling – Men's madison : Jang Sun-jae, Park Sung-Baek 
 Cycling – Men's team pursuit : Hwang In-Hyeok, Jang Sun-jae, Kim Dong-Hun, Park Sung-Baek
 Equestrian – Men's dressage : Choi Jun-Sang 
 Equestrian – Men's team dressage : Choi Jun-Sang, Kim Dong-Seon, Shin Soo-Jin, Seo Jung-Kyun
 Fencing – Women's Épée individual : Park Se-Ra
 Fencing – Women's Foil individual : Nam Hyun-Hee
 Fencing – Men's Épée team : Jung Jin-Sun, Kim Seung-Gu, Kim Won-Jin, Park Sang-Sun
 Fencing – Women's Foil team : Jeon Hee-Sook, Jung Gil-Ok, Nam Hyun-Hee, Seo Mi-Jung
 Golf – Men's individual : Kim Kyung-Tae 
 Golf – Women's individual : Ryu So-Yeon 
 Golf – Men's team : Kang Sung-hoon, Kim Do-hoon 752, Kim Do-hoon 753, Kim Kyung-Tae 
 Golf – Women's team : Choi Hye-Yong, Chung Jae-Eun, Ryu So-Yeon
 Gymnastics – Men's parallel bars : Kim Dae-Eun 
 Gymnastics – Men's pommel horse : Kim Soo-Myun 
 Handball – Women's team : Moon Kyeong-Ha, Kim Cha-Youn, Choi Im-Jeong, Lee Min-Hee, Moon Pil-Hee, Woo Sun-Hee, Kang Ji-Hey, Myoung Bok-Hee, An Jung-Hwa, Huh Young-Sook, Huh Soon-Young, Park Chung-Hee, Yoon Hyun-Kyung, Kwon Geun-Hae, Lee Gong-Joo, Yu Ji-Yeong
 Hockey – Men's team : Ko Dong-Sik, Lee Seung-Il, Kim Chul, Kim Yong-Bae, Lee Nam-Yong, Seo Jong-Ho, Kang Seong-Jung, Yoon Sung-Hoon, You Hyo-Sik, Yeo Chang-Yong, Cha Jong-Bok, Lee Myung-Ho, Hong Eun-Seong, Hong Sung-Kweon, Yeo Woon-Kon, Jang Jong-Hyun
 Judo – Men's 73 kg : Lee Won-Hee
 Judo – Men's 90 kg : Hwang Hee-Tae
 Judo – Men's 100 kg : Jang Sung-ho
 Judo – Men's openweight : Kim Sung-Bum
 Rowing – Men's single sculls : Shin Eun-chul
 Sailing – Men's 470 : Kim Dae-young, Jung Sung-an
 Shooting – Women's double trap : Son Hye-kyung 
 Shooting – Men's 25m standard pistol team : Hwang Yoon-sam, Jang Dae-kyu, Park Byung-taek 
 Shooting – Women's double trap team : Kim Mi-jin, Son Hye-kyung, Lee Bo-na
 Soft tennis – Mixed doubles : Wi Hyu-hwan, Kim Ji-Eun
 Soft tennis – Women's team : Kim Kyung-hyun, Lee Kyung-pyo, Lee Bok-soon, Min Soo-kyung, Kim Ji-eun
 Swimming – Men's 200 m freestyle : Park Tae-hwan 
 Swimming – Men's 400 m freestyle : Park Tae-hwan 
 Swimming – Men's 1500 m freestyle : Park Tae-hwan 
 Taekwondo – Men's 58 kg : You Young-dae 
 Taekwondo – Men's 62 kg : Kim Ju-Young 
 Taekwondo – Men's 67 kg : Song Myeong-seob 
 Taekwondo – Men's 72 kg : Lee Young-yeoul 
 Taekwondo – Men's +84 kg : Kim Hak-hwan 
 Taekwondo – Women's 51 kg : Kwon Eun-kyung 
 Taekwondo – Women's 55 kg : Kim Bo-hye 
 Taekwondo – Women's 59 kg : Lee Sung-hye 
 Taekwondo – Women's 67 kg : Hwang Kyung-Seon 
 Tennis – Men's team : An Jae-Sung, Chung Hee-Seok, Jeon Woong-Sun, Lee Hyung-Taik 
 Volleyball – Men's team : Shin Jin-Sik, Kwon Young-Min, Moon Sung-Min, Yeo Oh-Hyun, Song Byung-Il, Lee Sun-Kyu, Who In-Jung, Yun Bong-Woo, Lee Kyung-Soo, Kim Yo-han, Ha Kyoung-Min, Chang Byung-Chul
 Wrestling – Men's freestyle 66 kg : Baek Jin-Kuk
 Wrestling – Men's Greco-Roman 66 kg : Kim Min-Chul 
 Wrestling – Men's Greco-Roman 84 kg : Kim Jung-Sub 
 Wrestling – Men's Greco-Roman 96 kg : Han Tae-Young 
 Wrestling – Men's Greco-Roman 120 kg : Kim Gwang-Seok

Silver
 Archery – Women's individual : Yun Ok-Hee 
 Athletics – Men's 20 km walk : Kim Hyun-Sub 
 Badminton – Men's team : Shon Seung-Mo, Jung Jae-Sung, Park Sung-Hwan, Lee Yong-Dae, Hwang Jung-Un, Hwang Ji-Man, Lee Jae-Jin, Lee Hyun-Il
 Bodybuilding – Men's 90 kg : Kim Myong-Hun
 Bowling – Men's singles : Choi Bok-Eum  
 Bowling – Men's team of 5 : Choi Bok-Eum, Joung Seoung-Joo, Byun Ho-Jin, Kang Hee-Won, Jo Nam-Yi, Park Sang-Pil
 Bowling – Women's doubles : Choi Jin-A, Kim Yeo-Jin 
 Bowling – Women's team of 5 : Choi Jin-A, Hwang Sun-Ok, Gang Hye-Eun, Kim Yeo-Jin, Nam Bo-Ra
 Boxing – Men's bantamweight (54 kg) : Han Soon-Chul
 Boxing – Men's light-welterweight (64 kg) : Shin Myung-Hoon
 Boxing – Men's light-heavyweight (81 kg) : Song Hak-Sung
 Cue sports – Women's eight-ball singles : Kim Ga-Young 
 Cycling – Men's sprint : Choi Lae-Seon 
 Cycling – Women's points race : Lee Min-Hye 
 Equestrian – Men's team jumping : Hwang Soon-Won, Joo Jung-Hyun, Park Jae-Hong, Song Sang-Wook
 Fencing – Men's Foil individual : Lee Cheon-Woong
 Fencing – Men's Sabre individual : Oh Eun-Seok
 Fencing – Women's Foil individual : Seo Mi-Jung
 Fencing – Men's Foil team : Cha Hyung-Woo, Choi Byung-Chul, Ha Chang-Duk, Lee Cheon-Woong
 Fencing – Men's Sabre team : Lee Hyuk, Oh Eun-Seok, Oh Seung-Hwan, Won Woo-Young
 Fencing – Women's Épée team : Choi Eun-Sook, Jung Hyo-Jung, Park Se-Ra, Shin A-Lam
 Fencing – Women's Sabre team : Jang Hyun-Kyung, Kim Hye-Lim, Kim Keum-Hwa, Lee Shin-Mi
 Judo – Men's 60 kg : Cho Nam-Suk
 Judo – Women's 48 kg : Kim Young-Ran
 Judo – Women's 63 kg : Kong Ja-Young
 Judo – Women's 70 kg : Bae Eun-Hye
 Judo – Women's 78 kg : Lee So-Yeon
 Rowing – Men's double sculls : Kim Dal-Ho, Ham Jung-Wook
 Rowing – Women's double sculls : Kim Ok-Kyung, Shin Yeong-Eun
 Rugby union – Men's sevens : Chun Jong-Man, Kim Jong-Su, Chae Jae-Young, Kim Hyung-Ki, Lee Myung-Geun, Youn Kwon-Woo, Yang Young-Hun, Yun Hi-Su, You Young-Nam, Lee Kwang-Moon, Kwak Chul-Woong, Yoo Min-Hyung
 Sailing – Hobie 16 : Park Kyu-Tae, Sung Chang-Il
 Shooting – Men's 25m standard pistol : Park Byung-Taek 
 Shooting – Men's 10m air pistol team : Jin Jong-oh, Kim Young-Wook, Lee Dae-myung 
 Shooting – Men's 10m air rifle team : Kim Hye-Sung, Yu Jae-Chul, Chae Keun-Bae 
 Shooting – Men's 10m running target team : Cho Se-Jong, Hwang Young-Do, Jeong You-Jin 
 Shooting – Men's 25m centre fire pistol team : Hong Seong-Hwan, Jang Dae-Kyu, Park Byung-Taek 
 Shooting – Men's 50m rifle prone team : Jeon Dong-Ju, Lee Hyun-Tae, Park Bong-Duk
 Shooting – Women's 50m rifle 3-positions team : Lee Hye-jin, Na Yoon-Kyung, Lee Sang-Soon
 Soft tennis – Men's doubles : Yoo Young-Dong, Kim Jae-Bok
 Soft tennis – Mixed doubles : Yoo Young-Dong, Kim Kyung-Ryun
 Swimming – Men's 100 m freestyle : Park Tae-Hwan 
 Swimming – Women's 200 m butterfly : Choi Hye-Ra 
 Table tennis – Men's team : Oh Sang-Eun, Ryu Seung-Min, Joo Se-Hyuk, Lee Jung-Woo, Yoon Jae-Young
 Table tennis – Mixed doubles : Lee Jung-Woo, Lee Eun-Hee
 Taekwondo – Men's 84 kg : Park Kyeong-Hoon 
 Tennis – Men's singles : Lee Hyung-Taik 
 Weightlifting – Men's 77 kg : Lee Jeong-Jae 
 Weightlifting – Men's 94 kg : Lee Eung-Jo 
 Weightlifting – Women's 75 kg : Kim Soon-Hee 
 Weightlifting – Women's +75 kg : Jang Mi-Ran 
 Wrestling – Men's freestyle 60 kg : Song Jae-Myung 
 Wrestling – Men's freestyle 74 kg : Cho Byung-Kwan 
 Wrestling – Women's freestyle 48 kg : Kim Hyung-Joo

Bronze
 Athletics – Men's decathlon : Kim Kun-Woo 
 Athletics – Men's triple jump : Kim Deok-Hyeon 
 Athletics – Women's 100 m hurdles : Lee Yeon-Kyung 
 Badminton – Men's singles : Lee Hyun-Il 
 Badminton – Women's singles : Hwang Hye-Youn 
 Badminton – Men's doubles : Jung Jae-Sung, Lee Yong-Dae 
 Badminton – Women's doubles : Lee Kyung-Won, Lee Hyo-jung 
 Badminton – Women's team : Lee Kyung-Won, Lee Hyo-jung, Hwang Yu-Mi, Lee Yun-Hwa, Ha Jung-Eun, Lee Hyun-jin, Hwang Hye-Youn, Jun Jae-Youn 
 Baseball – Men's team : Cho Dong-Chan, Jo In-seong, Jang Sung-Ho, Jang Won-Sam, Jeong Keun-Woo, Jung Min-Hyuk, Kang Min-Ho, Lee Byung-Kyu, Lee Dae-Ho, Lee Hei-Chun, Lee Jin-Young, Lee Taek-Keun, Lee Yong-Kyu, Oh Seung-Hwan, Park Jae-Hong, Park Jin-Man, Park Ki-Hyuk, Ryu Hyun-Jin, Shin Chul-In, Son Min-Han, Woo Kyu-Min, Yoon Suk-Min
 Bodybuilding – Men's 80 kg : Lee Do-Hee
 Bodybuilding – Men's 85 kg : Kang Kyung-Won
 Bowling – Men's masters : Choi Bok-Eum  
 Bowling – Women's masters : Kim Yeo-Jin  
 Bowling – Women's trios : Choi Jin-A, Gang Hye-Eun, Kim Yeo-Jin
 Boxing – Men's light-flyweight (48 kg) : Hong Moo-Won
 Canoeing – Men's K1 1000 m : Moon Chul-Wook 
 Canoeing – Women's K2 500 m : Lee Sun-Ja, Lee Ae-Yeon 
 Cue sports – Men's three-cushion billiards singles : Kim Kyung-Roul  
 Cycling – Men's road race : Park Sung-Baek 
 Cycling – Men's 1 km time trial : Kang Dong-Jin 
 Cycling – Men's individual pursuit : Hwang In-Hyeok 
 Cycling – Women's road race : Han Song-Hee 
 Cycling – Women's individual time trial : Lee Min-Hye 
 Cycling – Women's sprint : Yoo Jin-A 
 Cycling – Women's 500 m time trial : Yoo Jin-A 
 Cycling – Men's team sprint : Choi Lae-Seon, Kang Dong-Jin, Yang Hee-Chun 
 Diving – Men's synchronized 3 m springboard : Kwon Kyung-Min, Cho Kwan-Hoon
 Diving – Men's synchronized 10 m platform : Kwon Kyung-Min, Cho Kwan-Hoon
 Equestrian – Men's jumping : Joo Jung-Hyun 
 Fencing – Men's Épée individual : Kim Seung-Gu
 Fencing – Women's Épée individual : Shin A-Lam
 Fencing – Women's Sabre individual : Kim Keum-Hwa
 Golf – Women's individual : Choi Hye-Yong
 Gymnastics – Men's floor : Kim Soo-Myun 
 Gymnastics – Men's horizontal bar : Kim Ji-Hoon 
 Gymnastics – Men's artistic team : Kim Dae-Eun, Kim Ji-Hoon, Kim Seung-Il, Kim Soo-Myun, Yang Tae-Young, Yoo Won-chul
 Judo – Men's 66 kg : Kim Kwang-Sub
 Judo – Women's 57 kg : Kang Sin-Young
 Judo – Women's +78 kg : Kim Na-Young
 Rowing – Women's coxless four : Kim Soon-Rye, Im Eun-Seon, Eom Mi-Seon, Min Su-Hyun
 Sailing – Men's laser : Kim Ho-Gon
 Sailing – Beneteau 7.5 : Yoon Cheul, Kim Tae-Jung, Kim Hyeong-Tae, Kim Sang-Suk
 Sepaktakraw – Women's team : Lee Myung-Eun, Park Keum-Duk, Jung Ji-Yung, Ahn Soon-Ok, Jeong In-Seon, Yu Yeong-Sim, Kim Hee-Jin, Park Na-Yeon, Song Jung-A, Kim Mi-Jeong
 Shooting – Men's 10m air pistol : Jin Jong-oh 
 Shooting – Men's 10m air rifle : Yu Jae-Chul 
 Shooting – Women's 10m air pistol : Kim Byung-Hee 
 Shooting – Women's 25m pistol : Kim Byung-Hee 
 Shooting – Women's 50m rifle 3-positions : Na Yoon-Kyung 
 Shooting – Women's double trap : Lee Bo-Na 
 Shooting – Men's 50m pistol team : Jin Jong-oh, Kim Young-Wook, Lee Sang-Do 
 Shooting – Women's 10m air pistol team : Boo Soon-Hee, Kim Byung-Hee, Lee Ho-Lim 
 Shooting – Women's skeet team : Kim Yeon-Hee, Kwak Yu-Hyun, Son Hye-Kyung 
 Shooting – Women's trap team : Lee Bo-Na, Lee Jung-A, Lee Myung-Ae
 Soft tennis – Men's singles : Nam Taek-Ho
 Soft tennis – Men's team : Jeong Young-Pal, Wi Hyu-Hwan, Kim Jae-Bok, Nam Taek-Ho, Yoo Young-Dong
 Soft tennis – Women's doubles : Lee Kyung-Pyo, Kim Kyung-Ryun
 Swimming – Men's 50 m backstroke : Sung Min 
 Swimming – Men's 200 m individual medley : Han Kyu-Chul 
 Swimming – Men's 400 m individual medley : Han Kyu-Chul 
 Swimming – Women's 400 m freestyle : Lee Ji-Eun 
 Swimming – Women's 100 m breaststroke : Baek Su-Yeon 
 Swimming – Women's 200 m breaststroke : Jung Seul-Ki 
 Swimming – Men's 4 × 100 m freestyle relay : Lim Nam-Gyun, Han Kyu-Chul, Sung Min, Park Tae-Hwan 
 Swimming – Men's 4 × 200 m freestyle relay : Lim Nam-Gyun, Han Kyu-Chul, Kang Yong-Hwan, Park Tae-Hwan
 Swimming – Men's 4 × 100 m medley relay : Jeong Doo-Hee, Park Tae-Hwan, Sung Min, You Seung-Hun
 Swimming – Women's 4 × 200 m freestyle relay : Jung Yoo-Jin, Lee Ji-Eun, Lee Keo-Ra, Park Na-Ri
 Swimming – Women's 4 × 100 m medley relay : Jung Seul-Ki, Lee Nam-Eun, Ryu Yoon-Ji, Shin Hae-In
 Table tennis – Men's singles : Ryu Seung-Min
 Table tennis – Women's team : Kim Kyung-Ah, Moon Hyun-Jung, Lee Eun-Hee, Park Mi-Young, Kwak Bang-Bang
 Table tennis – Mixed doubles : Joo Se-Hyuk, Kim Kyung-Ah
 Taekwondo – Women's 72 kg : Lee In-Jong 
 Tennis – Men's doubles : Jeon Woong-Sun, Kim Sun-yong 
 Weightlifting – Men's 56 kg : Lee Jong-Hoon 
 Weightlifting – Men's 69 kg : Kim Sun-Bae 
 Weightlifting – Men's 85 kg : Kim Seon-Jong 
 Weightlifting – Women's 69 kg : Kim Mi-Kyung 
 Wrestling – Men's freestyle 55 kg : Kim Hyo-Sub 
 Wrestling – Men's freestyle 84 kg : No Je-Hyun 
 Wrestling – Men's freestyle 120 kg : Lee Se-Hyung
 Wushu – Men's taolu nanquan : Lee Seung-Kyoon
 Wushu – Men's sanshou 56 kg : Kim Jun-Yeol
 Wushu – Men's sanshou 70 kg : Ahn Yong-Woon

References

Korea, South
2006
Asian Games